The gripping sailor's hitch is a secure, jam-proof friction hitch used to tie one rope to another, or a rope to a pole, boom, spar, etc., when the pull is lengthwise along the object. It will even grip a tapered object, such as a marlin spike, in the direction of taper, similar to the Icicle hitch, and it is much superior to the rolling hitch for that purpose.

Tying

See also
List of knots
Sailor's hitch
Sailor's knot
List of friction hitch knots

Notelist

References

External links 
 Video: Tying the Gripping Sailor's Hitch